Xu Jihua (born 14 September 1966) is a Chinese wrestler. He competed in the men's freestyle 52 kg at the 1988 Summer Olympics.

References

External links
 

1966 births
Living people
Chinese male sport wrestlers
Olympic wrestlers of China
Wrestlers at the 1988 Summer Olympics
Place of birth missing (living people)
Wrestlers at the 1986 Asian Games
Asian Games competitors for China
21st-century Chinese people
20th-century Chinese people